Adeeb Ahamed is a UAE-based billionaire businessman of Indian origin from the state of Kerala. He is the founder of Lulu International Exchange. He is the managing director of LuLu Financial Group, Tablez, and Twenty14 Holdings.  Adeeb is a member and sits on the advisory board of the World Economic Forum's South Asian Regional Strategy Group (RSG).

Biography
Adeeb Ahamed was born in Kochi, Kerala. He is also a trustee on the board of The Kochi Biennale Foundation (KBF). He was conferred with the Indian CEO of the Year Award in the ‘Financial Services’ category in the ITP Publishing Group's 2014 edition. He also serves as the Vice Chairman of the Foreign Exchange and Remittance Group (FERG) in the UAE and is an advisor to the board of the Al Maryah Community Bank in the UAE.

Awards and recognitions 
 
 NRI Businessman of the Year 2018
 Global Business Leader Award at NDTV Gulf Indian Excellence Awards 2016
 Global Business Man of the Year award at Brand Icons 2016
 CEO of the Year 2014 Award in the Financial Services Category at CEO Awards 2014
 He was named as one of the Richest Indians in the UAE 2018 by Arabian Business.

References 

Finance
Indian businesspeople
Indian emigrants to the United Arab Emirates
Indian expatriates in the United Arab Emirates
Year of birth missing (living people)
Living people
Businesspeople from Kochi